Matsuo Bashō (1644–1694) was a Japanese Edo-period poet.

Basho or Bashō  may also refer to:
 Bashō (crater), a crater on Mercury
 Basho (Hunter × Hunter), a character in Hunter × Hunter
 Basho Technologies, an American software company
 Bashō, a Noh play by Komparu Zenchiku
 Basho, a dialect of Denya language
 Basho, a concept in Kitaro Nishida's philosophy
 Basho and honbasho, a sumo wrestling tournament

People with the surname
 Diana Basho (born 2000), Albanian swimmer
 Robbie Basho (1940–1986), American guitarist

See also
 Steffen Basho-Junghans (born 1953), German guitarist